Mount Shelton is a mountain (2,485 m) located just west of the upper part of Rastorfer Glacier in the east-central portion of the Homerun Range, Admiralty Mountains. Mapped by United States Geological Survey (USGS) from surveys and U.S. Navy air photos, 1960–63. Named by Advisory Committee on Antarctic Names (US-ACAN) for John E. Shelton, United States Antarctic Research Program (USARP) meteorologist at Hallett Station, 1964–65.

Admiralty Mountains
Mountains of Victoria Land
Pennell Coast